Microscopy Research and Technique is a peer-reviewed scientific journal covering all areas of advanced microscopy in the biological, clinical, chemical, and materials science fields. The journal's title changed from Journal of Electron Microscopy Technique in 1992.

References

External links 
 

English-language journals
Monthly journals
Publications established in 1984
Wiley-Blackwell academic journals
Optics journals